Feira is a constituency of the National Assembly of Zambia. It covers the towns of Jeki, Kapoche, Katemo, Katondwe and Luangwa (previously known as Feira) in Luangwa District of Lusaka Province.

List of MPs

References

Constituencies of the National Assembly of Zambia
1973 establishments in Zambia
Constituencies established in 1973